Tawana may refer to:
Tswana  an ethnic group in Botswana
List of rulers of Tawana

People
Tawana Brawley rape allegations
Tawana Kupe Zimbabwean-South African academic
Kea Tawana (c. 1935 - August 4, 2016)  American artist known for creating the Ark, an 86-foot-long, three-story high ship she built in Newark